Kuldeep Singh (10 December 1940 – 22 October 2020), better known as K. Deep, was an Indian singer of Punjabi-language folk songs and duets. He sang most of the duets with his wife, singer Jagmohan Kaur. The duo is known for their comedy characters Mai Mohno and Posti. Poodna is another notable song by the duo. He was the first to sing songs penned by Shiv Kumar Batalvi. In 2010, he got PTC Life Time Achievement Award, along with Babu Singh Maan, which was presented to him by Punjabi singer Gurdas Maan.

Early life 
Deep was born on 10 December 1940 in Rangoon, Burma. His native village is Aitiana in Ludhiana district of Indian Punjab.

He met his wife Jagmohan Kaur in a program in Calcutta and they started working together as a Duo. Later, they got married on 2 February 1971, which was a love marriage. The couple had two children, named Billy and Raja, Raja got disowned in 2015 as they never had a good relationship. Billy was very close to both her parents, especially her father, and when the couple divorced Billy lived with him and stayed with him till he took his last breath. now she has grown to be a producer, following her dads footsteps.

Career 
He recorded his first LP in 1969 by HMV and the song was Nashean Naal Yaari, Roli Main Izzat Sari. He was the first to sing Shiv Kumar Batalvi's songs which were later sung by many other Punjabi singers including Jagjit Singh, Nusrat Fateh Ali Khan, Ghulam Ali.

As comedians, they were the first Punjabi duo to record comedy in records, and playing Mai Mohno and Posti, released several records including Posti Canada Vich, Posti England Vich, Nave Puare Pai Gae.

References

External links
 
 

1940 births
2020 deaths
People from Yangon
Indian male singers
Punjabi-language singers